Boštjan Ošabnik (born 7 August 1982) is a retired Slovenian tennis player.

Ošabnik has a career high ATP singles ranking of 381 achieved on 12 September 2005. He also has a career high ATP doubles ranking of 501 achieved on 3 October 2005.

Playing for Slovenia in Davis Cup, Ošabnik has a W/L record of 4–7.

External links

1982 births
Living people
Slovenian male tennis players
Mediterranean Games medalists in tennis
Mediterranean Games bronze medalists for Slovenia
Competitors at the 2005 Mediterranean Games